Yves Le Roy (born 23 February 1951) is a French athlete. He competed in the men's decathlon at the 1972 Summer Olympics.

References

1951 births
Living people
Athletes (track and field) at the 1972 Summer Olympics
French decathletes
Olympic athletes of France
Athletes from Paris